SMS Stralsund was a  light cruiser of the German Kaiserliche Marine. She was built at the AG Weser shipyard in Bremen from 1910 to December 1912, when she was commissioned into the High Seas Fleet.

Stralsund was assigned to the reconnaissance forces of the High Seas Fleet for the majority of her career. She saw significant action in the early years of World War I, including several operations off the British coast and the Battles of Heligoland Bight and Dogger Bank, in August 1914 and November 1915, respectively. She was not damaged in either action. The ship was in dockyard hands during the Battle of Jutland, and so she missed the engagement. After the end of the war, she served briefly in the Reichsmarine before being surrendered to the Allies. She was ceded to the French Navy, where she served as Mulhouse until 1925. She was formally stricken in 1933 and broken up for scrap two years later.

Design

Her propulsion system consisted of three sets of Bergmann steam turbines driving three screw propellers. These were powered by sixteen coal-fired Marine-type water-tube boilers, although they were later altered to use fuel oil that was sprayed on the coal to increase its burn rate. Stralsund had a crew of 18 officers and 336 enlisted men.

The ship was armed with a main battery of twelve  SK L/45 guns in single pedestal mounts. Two were placed side by side forward on the forecastle, eight were located amidships, four on either side, and two were side by side aft. They were supplied with 1,800 rounds of ammunition, for 150 shells per gun. She was also equipped with a pair of  torpedo tubes with five torpedoes; the tubes were submerged in the hull on the broadside. She could also carry 120 mines.

Service history
Stralsund was ordered under the contract name "Ersatz " and was laid down at the AG Weser shipyard in Bremen in September 1910 and launched on 4 November 1911, after which fitting-out work commenced. Named for the earlier schooner , she was commissioned into the High Seas Fleet on 10 December 1912. She thereafter conducted sea trials, which lasted until 15 February 1913. Stralsund spent the majority of her career in the reconnaissance forces of the High Seas Fleet.

World War I
On 16 August, some two weeks after the outbreak of World War I, Stralsund and  conducted a sweep into the Hoofden to search for British reconnaissance forces. Significantly outnumbered, the two German cruisers broke contact and returned to port.

The ship's first major action was the Battle of Heligoland Bight on 28 August 1914. British battlecruisers and light cruisers raided the German reconnaissance screen in the Heligoland Bight. At 12:30, Stralsund, and  arrived to reinforce Rear Admiral Leberecht Maass, and quickly turned the tide against the British light cruisers. Shortly thereafter, the British battlecruisers intervened and sank Ariadne and Maass's flagship . Stralsund and the rest of the surviving light cruisers retreated into the haze and were reinforced by the battlecruisers of the I Scouting Group. Stralsund and Danzig returned and rescued most of the crew of Ariadne.

She also participated in the raid on Yarmouth on 2–3 November 1914, as reconnaissance screen for the I Scouting Group. While the battlecruisers bombarded the town of Yarmouth, Stralsund laid a minefield, which sank a steamer and the submarine  which had sortied to intercept the German raiders. After completing the bombardment, the German squadron returned to port without encountering British forces. Stralsund was also present during the raid on Scarborough, Hartlepool and Whitby, again screening for the I Scouting Group. In the withdrawal after bombarding the towns, the Germans were nearly intercepted by British forces; the cruiser  spotted Stralsund and several torpedo boats. Confusion aboard the British flagship allowed the German squadron to escape, however. On 25 December, the British launched the Cuxhaven Raid, an air attack on the German naval base in Cuxhaven and the Nordholz Airbase. Stralsund engaged one of the attacking seaplanes, but was unable to shoot it down.

The ship was again part of the reconnaissance screen for the I Scouting Group at the Battle of Dogger Bank on 24 January 1915. At 08:15, lookouts on Stralsund and Kolberg spotted heavy smoke from large British warships approaching the formation. As the main German fleet was in port and therefore unable to support the battlecruisers, Hipper decided to retreat at high speed. The British battlecruisers were able to catch up to the Germans, however, and in the ensuing battle, the large armored cruiser  was sunk.

Stralsund was not available for the Battle of Jutland on 31 May – 1 June 1916 as she was being rearmed with 15 cm SK L/45 guns. The refit was completed at the Kaiserliche Werft shipyard in Kiel. The twelve 10.5 cm guns were replaced with seven 15 cm weapons and two 8.8 cm SK L/45 guns. On 2 February 1918, Stralsund struck a mine laid by British ships in the North Sea. The dreadnought  and several other ships steamed out to escort Stralsund back to port. The ship was unavailable for the major fleet operation on 23–24 April 1918 to intercept a British convoy to Norway.

Postwar and French service
After the war, Stralsund served briefly with the reorganized Reichsmarine in 1919. The Treaty of Versailles specified that the ship was to be disarmed and handed over to the Allies within two months of the signing of the treaty. She was ceded to France as a war prize under the transaction name "Z". The ship was formally handed over in Cherbourg on 3 August 1920. On arriving in France, she underwent a minor refit that consisted primarily of replacing her 8.8 cm guns with  anti-aircraft guns.

Mulhouse remained in service until a refit in 1925 in Brest. By this time, she was thoroughly worn out and was therefore placed in reserve shortly after completing the refit. On 15 February 1933, Mulhouse was stricken from the naval register and broken up for scrap in Brest in 1935. The ship's bell was later returned to Germany and is now on display at the Laboe Naval Memorial.

Footnotes

References

Further reading
 
 

Magdeburg-class cruisers
Ships built in Bremen (state)
1911 ships
World War I cruisers of Germany
Mulhouse